The State Aviation Administration of Ukraine is an agency of the Ukrainian government under the Ministry of Infrastructure responsible for civil aviation.

The head office is in Kyiv (14 Peremogy Avenue, Kyiv, 01135, Ukraine).

See also

 Ukraine National Bureau for Civilian Aircraft Events and Accidents Investigations
 List of airports in Ukraine

References

External links
 Official website 2 (Archive) 
 Air Code of Ukraine 
 Air Code of Ukraine (bill) 

Ukraine
Aviation
Aviation organizations based in Ukraine